Darren Craddock (born 23 February 1985) is a former English footballer who played as a defender.

Craddock started his career with Hartlepool United in 2003. He joined York City on a one-month loan in 2006, who he joined permanently later that year, after making 24 league appearances for Hartlepool.

Career
Born in Bishop Auckland, County Durham, Craddock joined the Hartlepool United youth system in 2001. Craddock played at Old Trafford in the FA Youth Cup third-round tie against Manchester United alongside Antony Sweeney and Matty Robson. Man United won 3-2 (AET) and featured future stars such as Darren Fletcher, Phil Bardsley and Kieran Richardson.

Craddock made his first team debut in a 4–0 victory over Whitby Town in the FA Cup first round on 8 November 2003. He joined Whitby Town on work experience in January 2004, where he made five appearances. He was handed his first professional contract by Hartlepool in June 2004, which was signed on 6 July.

In 2005, Craddock played at the Millennium Stadium in front of 79,000 fans in the 2005 Football League One play-off final for Hartlepool against Sheffield Wednesday.

He was signed by Conference National team York City on a one-month loan in January 2006. He was released by Hartlepool at the end of the 2005–06 season.

He signed for York permanently in May 2006, following his release by Hartlepool. He was warned he could face a spell on the sidelines by manager Billy McEwan after receiving a one-match ban after he was booked for fouling Forest Green Rovers striker Allan Russell after losing possession on the halfway line. He missed the rest of the 2006–07 season due to a fractured jaw, which was sustained against Cambridge United. He was offered a new contract by York at the end of the 2006–07 season. He was placed on standby for the England C team in February 2008 but two months later was released by York at the end of the 2007–08 season.

He joined Newcastle Blue Star of the Northern Premier League Division One North in June 2008. A year later, Craddock signed for Conference North side Blyth Spartans. He re-signed for former club Whitby in July 2010. Craddock signed for newly promoted Northern League Division One outfit Newton Aycliffe in July 2011, and scored on his debut for the team, a 6–1 victory over Stokesley Sports Club. Craddock made 83 appearances for the club.

Craddock signed for Shildon in May 2013 and won player of the year in his first season. He signed for West Auckland Town in May 2016.

Career statistics

Footnotes

A.  The "League" column constitutes appearances and goals (including those as a substitute) in the Football League, Football Conference, Northern Premier League and Northern League.
B.  The "Other" column constitutes appearances and goals (including those as a substitute) in the Conference League Cup, Durham Challenge Cup, FA Trophy, Football League Trophy, play-offs and Northern League Cup.

References

External links

1985 births
Living people
Sportspeople from Bishop Auckland
Footballers from County Durham
English footballers
Association football defenders
Hartlepool United F.C. players
Whitby Town F.C. players
York City F.C. players
Newcastle Blue Star F.C. players
Blyth Spartans A.F.C. players
Newton Aycliffe F.C. players
English Football League players
National League (English football) players
Northern Premier League players
Northern Football League players